The Mosque of Alexandroupolis is an Ottoman-era mosque in the town of Alexandroupolis, Western Thrace, in Greece. Like most mosques in Thrace, it is open for worship and serves the small Muslim community of the town. The entrance to the mosque is in the north side of Kassandras Street.

Description

History 

The mosque has stood for longer than Alexandroupolis has been a town, its construction dated to before 1895. According to a plaque above its door, the mosque was opened in 1906. On its grounds originally stood a madrasa (Islamic school), but it now now just the mosque stands surrounded by other buildings. It has been destroyed by arson twice during the 20th century, most recently in 1993, and each time its rebuilding was financed by the Greek government. The first was during the Bulgarian occupation of the town, and the second in 1993, by person or persons unknown.

The mosque, which is built next to a Muslim minority primary school, is still used regularly by the local Muslim community. The mosque has also been subjected to attacks by right wing nationalists, the most recent of which occurred in 2014.

Architecture 
The mosque of Alexandroupolis is a square room with praying hall. It has a marble structure, with elaborate decoration and a multitude of engraved inscriptions, which are considered a remarkable example of the sculptural marble art for its time. On the west side of the Muslim mosque stands the tomb of an Ottoman general, Fayek Hussein Pasha, which is also made of marble.

The minaret is on the western side of the mosque.

See also 

 Islam in Greece
 List of former mosques in Greece
 List of mosques in Greece
 Ottoman Greece

References 

19th-century architecture in Greece
19th-century mosques
Ottoman Thrace
Ottoman mosques in Greece
Buildings and structures in Evros (regional unit)
Alexandroupolis